The Safavid conversion of Iran to Shia Islam was a process of forced conversion that took place roughly over the 16th through 18th centuries and turned Iran (Persia), which previously had a Sunni majority population, into the spiritual bastion of Shia Islam. It was a process that resulted in hostility with Iran's Sunni neighbours, most notably the Ottoman Empire. The conversion also ensured the dominance of the Twelver sect within Shiism over the sects of Zaidiyyah and Isma'ilism – each of whom had previously experienced their own eras of dominance within Shi'ism. Through their actions, the Safavids reunified Iran as an independent state in 1501 and established Twelver Shi'ism as the official religion of their empire, marking one of the most important turning points in the history of Islam.

As a direct result, the population of the territory of present-day Iran and neighbouring Azerbaijan were converted to Shia Islam at the same time in history. Both nations still have large Shia majorities, and the Shia percentage of Azerbaijan's population is second only to that of Iran.

Pre-Safavid Iran
Iran's population after the Arab conquest and conversion was mostly Sunni of the Shafi'i and Hanafi legal schools until the triumph of the Safavids (who had   initially been Shafi'i Sufis themselves). Ironically, this was to the extent that up until the end of the 15th century the Ottoman Empire (the most powerful and prominent Sunni state and future arch-enemy of the Shia Safavids) used to send many of its Ulama (Islamic scholars) to Iran to further their education in Sunni Islam, due to a lack of Madrasahs (Islamic schools) within the Ottoman Empire itself. Persia was also a seat of Sunni learning. The Sunni Iranians had always held the family of Muhammad in high esteem. In contrast, before the Safavid period, a minority of Iranians were Shia and there had been relatively few Shia Ulama in Iran.

Shah Ismail I of Iran 

From 1500 to 1502 Ismail I conquered Tabriz in Iran, as well as Armenia, Azerbaijan, and parts of Dagestan (North Caucasus, today a part of Russia). He would take most of the next decade to consolidate his control over Iran, where most of the Persian population was still Sunni. His army spread out first to the central regions in 1504. He captured southwestern Iran between 1505 and 1508 before finally conquering the Khorasan region and the city of Herat in 1510. According to Daniel W. Brown, Isma'il was "the most successful and intolerant [Shiite] ruler since the fall of the Fatimids". It appears that he aimed for complete destruction of Sunni Islam, and he largely achieved that goal in the lands over which he ruled. His hatred of the Sunnis knew no bounds, and his persecution of them was ruthless. He required the first three caliphs Abu Bakr, Umar and Uthman to be ritually cursed, abolished Sunni Sufi orders, seizing their property, and gave Sunni ulama a choice of conversion, death, or exile. Shi'ite scholars were brought in from other regions to take their place.

Reasons for Ismail's conversion policy
More than most Muslim dynasties, the Safavids worked for conversion to their branch of Islam and for ideological conformity. The reasons for this conversion policy included:
 Ismail and his followers pursued such a severe conversion policy in order to give Iran and the Safavid lands as distinct and unique an identity as was possible compared to its two neighboring Sunni Turkic military and political enemies, its arch rival the Ottoman Empire, and, for a time, the Central Asian Uzbeks — to the west and north-east respectively.
The Safavids were engaged in a lengthy struggle with the Ottomans — the Ottoman-Persian Wars — and this struggle motivated the Safavids to create a more cohesive Iranian identity to counter the Ottoman threat; and eliminate a possible fifth-column within Iran among its Sunni subjects.
The conversion was part of the process of building a territory that would be loyal to the state and its institutions, thus enabling the state and its institutions to consolidate their rule throughout the whole territory.

Methods of converting Iran
Ismail consolidated his rule over the country and launched a thorough and, at times, brutal campaign to convert the majority Sunni population to Twelver Shiism and thus transform the religious landscape of Iran. His methods of converting Iran included:
Imposing Shiism as the state and mandatory religion for the whole nation and much forcible conversion of Iranian Sufi Sunnis to Shiism.
He reintroduced the Sadr (Arabic, leader) – an office that was responsible for supervising religious institutions and endowments. With a view to transforming Iran into a Shiite state, the Sadr was also assigned the task of disseminating Twelver doctrine.
He destroyed Sunni mosques. This was even noted by Tomé Pires, the Portuguese ambassador to China who visited Iran in 1511–12, who when referring to Ismail noted: "He (i.e. Ismail) reforms our churches, destroys the houses of all Moors who follow (the Sunnah of) Muhammad…"
He enforced the ritual and compulsory cursing of the first three Sunni Caliphs (Abu Bakr, Umar, and Uthman) as usurpers, from all mosques, disbanded Sunni Tariqahs and seized their assets, used state patronage to develop Shia shrines, institutions and religious art and imported Shia scholars to replace Sunni scholars.
He killed Sunnis and destroyed and desecrated their graves and mosques. This caused the Ottoman Sultan Bayezid II (who initially congratulated Ismail on his victories) to advise and ask the young monarch (in a "fatherly" manner) to stop the anti-Sunni actions. However, Ismail was strongly anti-Sunni, ignored the Sultan's warning, and continued to spread the Shia faith by the sword.
He persecuted, imprisoned, exiled, and executed stubbornly resistant Sunnis.
With the establishment of Safavid rule, there was a very raucous and colourful, almost carnival-like holiday on 26 Dhu al-Hijjah (or alternatively, 9 Rabi' al-awwal) celebrating the Eid-e-Shuja' or Celebration of assassination of Caliph Umar. The highlight of the day was making an effigy of Umar to be cursed, insulted, and finally burned. However, as relations between Iran and Sunni countries improved, the holiday was no longer observed (at least officially).
In 1501, Ismail invited all the Shia living outside Iran to come to Iran and be assured of protection from the Sunni majority.

The fate of Sunni and Shia Ulema (scholars)

Sunni Ulama
The early Safavid rulers took a number of steps against the Sunni Ulama of Iran. These steps included giving the Ulama  the choice of conversion, death, or exile and massacring the Sunni clerics who resisted the Shia transformation of Iran, as witnessed in Herat. As a result, many Sunni scholars who refused to adopt the new religious direction lost their lives or fled to the neighboring Sunni states.

Arab Shia Ulama
After the conquest, Ismail began transforming the religious landscape of Iran by imposing Twelver Shiism on the populace. Since most of the population embraced Sunni Islam and since an educated version of Shiism was scarce in Iran at the time, Ismail imported a new Shia Ulama corps from traditional Shiite centers of the Arabic speaking lands, largely from Jabal Amil (of Southern Lebanon), Mount Lebanon,  Syria, Eastern Arabia and Southern Iraq in order to create a state clergy. Ismail offered them land and money in return for loyalty. These scholars taught the doctrine of Twelver Shiism and made it accessible to the population and energetically encouraged conversion to Shiism. To emphasize how scarce Twelver Shiism was then to be found in Iran, a chronicler tells us that only one Shia text could be found in Ismail's capital Tabriz. Thus it is questionable whether Ismail and his followers could have succeeded in forcing a whole people to adopt a new faith without the support of the Arab Shiite scholars. The rulers of Safavid Persia also invited these foreign Shiite religious scholars to their court in order to provide legitimacy for their own rule over Persia.

Abbas I of Persia, during his reign, also imported more Arab Shia Ulama to Iran, built religious institutions for them, including many Madrasahs (religious schools) and successfully persuaded them to participate in the government, which they had shunned in the past (following the Hidden imam doctrine).

Conversions beyond Iran

Azerbaijan

After conquering Tabriz in Iran, along with Azerbaijan, southern Dagestan, and Armenia from 1500 to 1502, one of the first acts of Ismail was to declare Twelver Shiism to be the state religion, despite the predominance of Sunni Muslims in the newly acquired territories. After the declaration, a conversion campaign was launched and Muslim peoples of the Caucasus, came under heavy pressure to accept Shiism. The imposition of Shiism was especially harsh in Shirvan, where a large Sunni population was massacred. Thus, the population of Azerbaijan was forcibly converted to Shiism in the early 16th century at the same time as the people of what is nowadays Iran, when the Safavids held sway over it. Modern-day Azerbaijan therefore contains the second largest population of Shia Muslims by percentage right after Iran, and the two along with Iraq and Bahrain are the only countries where a majority of the population is, at least nominally, Shia Muslim.

Iraq

Ismail seized Baghdad in 1508. However, his armies zealously killed Sunnis and actively persecuted them through tribal allies of the Shah. His armies also destroyed several important Sunni sites, including the tombs of Abū Ḥanīfa and Abdul-Qadir Gilani. The Safavids even expelled the family of Gilani from Mesopotamia. After declaring Shiism the official form of Islam in Iraq, Ismail forced his new Iraqi subjects to convert to Shiism and outlawed Sunni practices. He then returned to Persia. These draconian actions by the conquering Safavids caused the Mesopotamian Sunnis to seethe with resentment.

Likewise, under Tahmasp I, central and southern Iraq, including Baghdad and Basra had remained in Safavid hands and efforts were being made to establish Shiism in place of Sunnism in these lands. Sunni scholars who refused to accept Shia doctrines were executed and Sunni tombs and shrines were destroyed once again, while the main mosques were converted for Shia use only. While not extensive, some conversions did take place, and those remaining faithful to Sunnism were subjected to persecution until Suleiman the Magnificent expelled the Safavids from most of Iraq.

When the Safavids returned in 1624 under the rule of Abbas I of Persia and reconquered Baghdad, they once more again massacred the Sunni inhabitants.

Significant figures during the conversion process

Ismail II
Ismail II's reign (1576–77) was marked by a pro-Sunni policy. With the assistance of Makhdum Sharifi Shirazi, the new Sadr, Ismail II strove to reverse the anti-Sunni practices among the populace. More specifically he strove to halt the public defamation of Aisha and the ritual cursing of Abu Bakr, Umar and Uthman (including the banning of the tabarrā'iyān, known as the tabaqa-yi tabarrā'i, whose official occupation was to publicly curse such figures and other supposed enemies of the Ahl al-Bayt), which rose during the early Safavid rule.

A few motives may account for Ismail II's approach to the anti-Sunni propaganda. A primary one was that he was keen to comply with one of the Ottoman demands of the Peace of Amasya concluded in 1555, which called for an end to the vilification of the first three Sunni Caliphs, thus placating the Ottomans and solidifying his own personal position. Another was his attempt to weaken the clerics as he attempted to forcibly demand land grants from Sayyids and Shia Ulema. The shah also clashed with the Ustajlu tribe and a number of Qizilbash amirs who were allied to the clerics. Thus, the public denunciation of Sunni emblems became one stage on which this power struggle between the Shah and the cleric-Qizilbash group was played out.

The Shah hoped to weaken the public appeal of the Amili clerics who administered and encouraged ritual cursing of the first three Sunni Caliphs among Iranians.  His Sunni flirtation was also intended to reach out to the still-strong Sunni sympathies among Persians. Despite their quick rejection of Ismail II's policies, the majority of Ulema and the military-political centre avoided a confrontation with him, even though in place of zealous Shia scholars like the Astarabadis, the Shah appointed Ulema with Sunni leanings such as Mawlana Mirza Jan Shirazi and Mir Makhdum Lala. Ismail II also wanted to do away with the inscribed names of the 12 imams on the Safavid coinage, but his attempt came to nought.

Abbas I of Persia
Shiism did not become fully established until the reign of Abbas I of Persia (1587–1629). Abbas hated the Sunnis, and forced the population to accept Twelver Shiism. Thus by 1602 most of the formerly Sunnis of Iran had accepted Shiism. A significant number, however, did not accept Safavid rule, prompting Abbas to institute a number of administrative changes in order to further transform Iran into a Twelver Shia state.

Muhammad Baqir Majlisi
Under the guidance of Muhammad Baqir Majlisi (1616–98, one of the most important Shiite clerics of all time), who devoted himself to (among other things) the eradication of Sunnism in Iran, the Safavid state made major efforts, in the 17th century to Persianize Shiite practice and culture in order to facilitate its spread in Iran among its Sunni populace. It was only under Majlisi that Shi'a Islam truly took hold among the masses.

Emergence of a clerical aristocracy
Because of the relative insecurity of property ownership in Persia, many private landowners secured their lands by donating them to the clergy as so called vaqf. They would thus retain the official ownership and secure their land from being confiscated by royal commissioners or local governors, as long as a percentage of the revenues from the land went to the ulama and the quasi-religious organizations run by dervishes (futuvva). Increasingly, members of the religious class, particularly the mujtahids and the seyyeds, gained full ownership of these lands, and, according to contemporary historian Iskandar Munshi, Persia started to witness the emergence of a new and significant group of landowners.

Sultan Husayn
During the reign of Sultan Husayn (r. 1694–1722) (the last effective Safavid Shah), there was a lot of religious unrest and religiously motivated rebellions in the Safavid state. Amongst the foreign interests, decades of misrule by incapable Shahs, and tireless wars against the Safavid's arch rival, the Ottoman Turks, and new imperial rival, Russia, that wrecked the Safavid state and made it decline. The religious unrest and rebellions were especially provoked by his ill-fated persecution of the Sunnis living under his control. These troubles contributed to the further destabilization of the Safavid empire (towards the final years of its existence) and were factors that contributed in bringing the Safavids into an existential crisis.

Despite the heavy decline of the Safavid state, it was when Sultan Husayn tried to forcibly convert his Afghan subjects from Sunni to Shia in the Safavids' easternmost territories of southern Afghanistan that caused Mir Wais Hotak (chief of the Ghilzai Afghans) to start a rebellion in the Kandahar region in 1709. Mir Wais and his Sunni Afghans killed the Safavid governor George XI of Kartli, along with the Shah's armies, and made the Afghan area free from the Shia's rule. The declaration of independence at Kandahar in 1709 was a turning point that was followed by the conquest of Herat by the Ghilzai Afghans in 1715 and the invasion of Iran. By the same course of the 1710s, there were numerous other uprisings and insurrections in other parts of the Safavid domains, often inspired by the persecutions instigated against non-Shiite minorities by the leading Shia Safavid ulama, e.g. the 1721 sack of Shamakhi, in the northwestern part of the Safavid domain, which resulted in the massacre of thousands of its Shia inhabitants. Mir Wais' son Mahmud defeated the Safavids in the 1722 Battle of Gulnabad, marching west to besiege and capture their capital, Isfahan, thus effectively ending the Safavid dynasty.

Nader Shah

During the reign of Nader Shah, an anti-Shiite policy was implemented. Nader made an unsuccessful attempt to return Iran to the Sunni fold by propagating the integration of Shiism into Sunnism as the fifth of the already extant four Sunni Madh'habs (to be called the Jaafari Madh'hab). However, the scheme to establish this form of Sunnism as the state religion failed to win support among most of the population. The reasons for his anti-Shia policy included:

Most of his troops were Sunni Afghan, Steppe Turkmen, Caucasians, Khorasan Kurds and Baluchis and Christian Georgians and Armenians, since his own pro-Sunni beliefs had alienated his Shiite Iranian soldiers, who included the Shia Turkoman and ethnic Persian soldiers from central and western Iran, who made up the Safavid partisans.
It was an original religious policy, aimed at weakening Shia power, promoting his own rule in Sunni lands outside Iran and making Shiism a 5th school of orthodox Sunni Islam — a proposal rejected by both Sunni rulers and Shiites.
Nader made various attempts to reconcile his Persian subjects' Shia beliefs with the Sunni creed and sought to get the Ottomans to recognize this new Persian Sunnism as its own sect with the possible motivation being to facilitate relations with the Sunni Ottomans, but possibly his real aim was to overthrow the Turks by uniting the Muslim world with him as its head.
In 1736, after being chosen by an assembly of notables to be Shah, Nader agreed to accept on condition that they accept his new religious policy of restoring Sunnism in Iran. The abandonment of Shiism was necessary as the linchpin of a peace treaty he wanted to conclude with the Sunni Ottomans and was probably intended also as a way of diminishing the religious prestige of the Safavid house and of making himself a more attractive figure to the Sunni populations of areas he was planning to conquer.  However, his religious policy fueled discontent in Iran itself.

He implemented the following anti-Shia policies:
Nader abandoned Shiism and instead founded a mixed Shia/Sunni Islamic school of theology, to add to the other four Sunni schools of law.
Nader had the leading cleric in Persia strangled.
He relied on his army, which was increasingly recruited from Sunni Afghans, Kurds, Turkmen, Baluchis and others (who naturally were gratified by the new religious policy).
The Persians were not simply ordered to adopt Sunnism as practiced elsewhere in the Muslim world; they were to retain their own discrete religious identity.
 Internally, he banned certain Shia practices; the more extreme ones, typical of the early Safavid period.  He issued instructions to the Ulema that Imam Ali should be venerated as before, but that the formula naming him as the deputy of God should no longer be spoken, because it had caused enmity between Shias and Sunnis. Externally he presented the policy as a wholesale conversion to Sunnism. In general, this religious policy did not provoke popular opposition within Persia because the people simply adapted.
In 1736 from Qazvin he issued an edict that was sent throughout the country, enforcing the cessation of the traditional Shia practices that were most offensive to Sunnis.
Nader made a major effort to redefine the place of Shiism within the Islamic world by working to gain recognition from the major Sunni powers. He attempted to integrate a redefined Shiism into the Sunni tradition. He rejected the Shia condemnation of the first three Sunni Caliphs and enforced that position within his realm. In addition, he tried to secure Ottoman recognition of Twelver Shiism as a fifth Sunni school of law, to be called the Jaafari school after the 6th Imam, Jafar al-Sadiq. The whole pattern of Shiism as built on the idea of the Imamate was to be replaced. However, neither the Sunni Ottomans nor the major Shia scholars of the time accepted his redefinition.
Nader alienated the Shiite clergy (partly in order to destroy the influential position they held) by trying to bridge the gap between Sunni and Shia by attempting to restore Sunnism in Iran. He also confiscated large sections of the religious endowment lands (Waqfs) belonging to Shia religious institutions. Fearful for their lives and feeling threatened in Iran, many Persian clergymen sought refuge and settlement in Iraq and formed the core of the Shia religious infrastructure that has persisted until the present around the Shia shrines in Iraq, such as Najaf and Karbala.

After Nader's death and the rapid disintegration of his empire, Shiism was quickly restored and religious properties were built up again in the following century.

Historical outcome of Ismail's conversion policy

Ismail's conversion policy had the following historical outcomes:
Although conversion was not as rapid as Ismail's forcible policies might suggest, the vast majority of those who lived in the territory of what is now Iran and Azerbaijan did identify with Shiism by the end of the Safavid era in 1722. Thus, the population of Azerbaijan was forcibly converted to Shiism in the early 16th century at the same time as the people of what is nowadays Iran, when the Safavids held sway over it. Hence it is no accident that in Iran and Azerbaijan, today's Sunni minorities are concentrated among the country's non-Persian and non-Azerbaijani ethnic groups that are scattered along the country's borders, with their Sunni co-nationals next door.
The Safavid experience largely created the clear line of political demarcation and hostility between Twelver Shiism and Sunnism, even though doctrinal differences had long been recognized. Before the Safavids the Twelvers for many centuries had mostly accommodated themselves politically to the Sunnis, and numerous religious movements combined Twelver and Sunni ideas.
Ismail's advent to power signaled the end of Sunni Islam in Iran and Shiite theologians came to dominate the religious establishment.
The hierarchical organization of the Shiite clergy began under Ismail.
The current borders between Iran, on the one hand, and Afghanistan and Turkey on the other, date from this time and are not ethnic but religious, opposing Shiites and Sunnis.
The Sunni majority was treated brutally and was most resistant to the Safavids' conversion policies, which went on at least until the end of the Safavid period.
The use of the Shia religion to exert control was not completely successful. It resulted in the annexation of large areas of the country, but was followed by centuries of conflict between the Sunni and Shia populations, even after the fall of the Safavids.
Iran was a Shia country and gradually became an isolated island surrounded by a sea of Sunnism. While lamenting the cruelty of forced conversion, modern Iranian historians generally agree that the establishment of Shia religious hegemony ultimately saved Iran from being incorporated into the Ottoman Empire.
The Ottoman advance in Europe suffered (since they now had to split their military resources) as Safavid Iran and European powers forged alliances, such as the Habsburg–Persian alliance, to combat their common Ottoman enemy.
The word 'Safavi' which means Safavid, as used by Sunnis, came to be associated with any expansionist Shia groups acting against Sunnis or their interests. The label is especially used against Iran or Iranian-backed groups and has particularly found currency during the sectarian turmoil in the Middle-East in the early 21st century, e.g. in Syria, Lebanon, Iraq and Yemen.

See also
Safavid impact on Shiism
Nader Shah's religious policy
Shia–Sunni relations
Current situation of Iranian Sunnis
Islam in Azerbaijan

References

Sources
 
 Yves Bomati and Houchang Nahavandi,Shah Abbas, Emperor of Persia,1587-1629, 2017, ed. Ketab Corporation, Los Angeles, English translation by Azizeh Azodi.
 
 

Conversion
Islam in Iran
Islam in Azerbaijan

Persecution by Muslims
Anti-Sunni attacks and incidents
Shia Islam and politics
Shia–Sunni relations
History of Iran